"What Kind of Man" is a song by English indie rock band Florence and the Machine from their third studio album, How Big, How Blue, How Beautiful (2015). It was written by Florence Welch, Kid Harpoon and John Hill, produced by Markus Dravs and co-produced by Hill. The song was released on 12 February 2015 as the album's lead single. "What Kind of Man" received Grammy Award nominations for Best Rock Performance and Best Rock Song.

Composition
According to lead vocalist Florence Welch, the song represents a new guitar-driven sonic direction for the band. "It's got very loud guitars and that was very fun to record actually", she said in an interview. "Trying to get exactly the right tone of guitar—I never realised how complicated that is. It took us forever.... Every day there'd be a different guitar sound. We ended up layering with three different guitar sounds, one on top of the other, in order to create this one song."

The song builds slowly and breaks into a heavy beat with tambourine and bass drum, and then becomes a textured pop song with heavy brass arrangements. The song lyrically focuses on an indecisive man who wronged Welch.

Critical reception
"What Kind of Man" received acclaim from music critics. Al Horner of NME wrote, "Musically, it's big. Wagnerian backing vocals and horn blasts turn 'What Kind Of Man' into a spectacle worthy of [Welch's] new festival headliner status". Dee Lockett of Vulture dubbed it a "fiery rocker". Andrew Unterberger of Spin opined that the song "starts off a letdown, but quickly proves to be ['Ship to Wreck's] roaring equal, with the unexpected arrival of a thick guitar chop and regal horn salute that gives Florence the instrumental support she deserves as she excoriates an uncommitted significant other".

Commercial performance
"What Kind of Man" debuted at number 57 on the UK Singles Chart, peaking at number 37 the following week. In the United States, the song reached number eight on the Billboard Alternative Songs chart, tying with the band's 2008 single "Dog Days Are Over" and subsequent single "Ship to Wreck" as their highest-peaking single on that chart. As of July 2018, the song had sold 177,000 copies and had been streamed 11.2 million times in the United Kingdom.

Music video
The music video for "What Kind of Man", directed by Vincent Haycock and choreographed by Ryan Heffington, premiered on 12 February 2015. Filmed in Los Angeles and Mérida, Mexico, the video is a short film that includes dialogue about the unifying power of tragedy in a relationship between a couple as they drive down a country road. Scenes of the couple driving at various points in their relationship are interspersed with examples of the woman and her relationships with different men, often taking on a smothering quality. The woman later is the centre of religious rituals that involve her being lifted by several men, including her love interest played by Richie Stephens, speaking in tongues, baptism and exorcism.

Track listings
Digital download – Nicolas Jaar Remix
"What Kind of Man" (Nicolas Jaar Remix) – 12:21

Limited-edition 12-inch single (Record Store Day exclusive)
A. "What Kind of Man"
B. "As Far as I Could Get"

Credits and personnel
Credits adapted from the liner notes of How Big, How Blue, How Beautiful.

Recording
 Engineered at The Pool (London)
 Mixed at The Mixsuite (UK)
 Mastered at Sterling Sound (New York City)

Personnel
Florence and the Machine
 Florence Welch – vocals, backing vocals
 Chris Hayden – drums, percussion
 Mark Saunders – bass
 Rob Ackroyd – electric guitar

Additional personnel

 Markus Dravs – production, percussion, synths
 John Hill – co-production, synths, brass writing, brass arrangements
 Robin Baynton – engineering
 Jonathan Sagis – engineering assistance
 Joe Kearns – additional engineering
 Iain Berryman – additional engineering
 Leo Abrahams – electric guitar
 Janelle Martin – backing vocals
 Nim Miller – backing vocals
 Baby N'Sola – backing vocals
 Kid Harpoon – brass writing, brass arrangements
 Nigel Black – French horn
 Pip Eastop – French horn
 Sam Jacobs – French horn
 Elise Campbell – French horn
 John Barclay – trumpet
 Andy Crowley – trumpet
 Philip Cobb – trumpet
 Tom Rees-Roberts – trumpet
 Andy Wood – Euphonium
 Ed Tarrant – Euphonium
 Richard Edwards – tenor trombone
 Oren Marshall – tuba
 Mat Bartram – brass recording
 Ronan Phelan – brass recording assistance
 Mark "Spike" Stent – mixing
 Geoff Swan – mixing assistance
 Ted Jensen – mastering

Charts

Weekly charts

Year-end charts

Certifications

Release history

Notes

References

2015 singles
2015 songs
British garage rock songs
Florence and the Machine songs
Island Records singles
Music videos shot in Mexico
Song recordings produced by John Hill (record producer)
Song recordings produced by Markus Dravs
Songs written by Florence Welch
Songs written by John Hill (record producer)
Songs written by Kid Harpoon